Pierre Froidebise (15 May 1914 – 28 October 1962) was a Belgian organist, composer, and musicologist.

Life
Froidebise was born in the rural Condroz village of Ohey, province of Namur, the son of a well-off retail pharmacist. He took the first prize for organ in 1939, and in 1941 won the Agniez Prize for composition.

He subsequently studied composition with Paul Gilson and Jean Absil, before moving to Paris to further his organ studies with Charles Tournemire. In 1942 he became organist at the church of Saint-Jacques in Liège, where later he performed and was choirmaster at the Grand Séminaire and taught harmony at the Conservatory, where he was appointed professor in 1947.

In the meantime, he won the Belgian second Prix de Rome in 1943 for his cantata La navigation d’Ulysse.

As a teacher, his notable students include  and Henri Pousseur. Froidebise died in Liège on 28 October 1962.

Compositional style
Froidebise's earliest organ compositions show the influence of César Franck, but his enthusiasm soon turned to Igor Stravinsky for his model. His Trois poèmes japonais for voice and orchestra, Op. 1, No. 1 (1942), while exhibiting traits of his teacher Absil, in its overall feeling recalls Stravinsky's Three Japanese Lyrics, and the Russian master's presence is even clearer in the Cinq comptines for voice and eleven instruments, Op. 1, No. 2 (1947), which was performed at the 1950 ISCM Festival. His discovery of the music of Anton Webern led to a decisive turn to serialism beginning in 1948, with the cantata Amercœur—a rather severe work setting Liège place names in an economical twelve-tone technique.

From this point onward, Froidebise was a confirmed dodecaphonist and maintained regular contact with Olivier Messiaen, René Leibowitz, and Pierre Boulez in Paris. His finest work, Stèle pour Sei Shonagon (1958), for soprano and four instrumental groups, added aleatory elements to a warmer use of twelve-tone technique than that found in Amercœur, combined with a supple rhythmic treatment.

Compositions

Dramatic
Radio operas: 
La bergère et le ramoneur (1954)
La lune amère (1956)
Ballets: 
Le bal chez le voisin, orchestra (1954)
L’aube
Incidental music: 
Antigone (Sophocles, 1936)
Oedipe roi (Sophocles, ?1946)
Ce vieil Oedipe (A. Curvers, ?1946)
Elkerlyc (1949)
Jan van Nude (M. Lambilliotte, 1951)
Les choéphores (Aeschylus, 1954)
Hippolyte (Euripides)
La maison à deux portes (Calderón)
Une ville chantait (J. de Coune)
Le p’tit bateau de la réunion (J.M. Landier)
Film scores:
Visite à Picasso (Paul Haesaerts, 1951), collab. André Souris 
Lumière des hommes (Bernhart, 1954)

Orchestral
De l’aube à la nuit (1934–37)
La légende de St Julien l’Hospitalier (1941)

Vocal
Notre père (?1934)
La lumière endormie, cantata (1941)
Trois poèmes japonais, Op. 1, No. 1, soprano or tenor and orchestra (1942)
Trois poèmes japonais, for middle voice and piano (1942)
La navigation d’Ulysse, cantata, 1943
Cinq comptines, Op. 1, No. 2, soprano or tenor and 11 instruments, (1947)
Amercœur, Op. 1, No. 3, soprano, wind quintet, and piano (1948)
La cloche engloutie, cantata (1956)
Stèle pour Sei Shonagon, Op. 1, No. 4, soprano and chamber orchestra (19 instruments), 1958
Ne recorderis
Poème chinois, soprano or tenor and piano
Choral motets: 
"Justorum animae"
"Laudate Dominum"
"Puer natus est"

Chamber music
Sonata, violin and piano (1938) 
Petite suite monodique, flute or clarinet 
Petite suite, wind quintet
Dom Japhet d'Arménie, 2 clarinets, 2 bassoons, 2 horns, 2 trumpets, 2 trombones, harpsichord, 3 timpani, and percussion (1956)

Keyboard
Piano:
Sept croquis brefs (1934)
La légende de St Julien l’Hospitalier (1940; orch. 1941)
Hommage à Chopin (1947) 
Livre de ricercare
Organ:
Trois pièces (1933)
Suite brève (1934)
Diptyque (1936)
Prelude and Fugue (1936)
Sonatina (1939)
Prelude and Fughetta
Livre de noëls belges
Hommage à J.S. Bach

References
 Koninklijk Conservatorium Brussel now houses most works and manuscripts of Froidebise, after the bankruptcy of CeBeDeM in 2015.

Further reading
 Pirenne, Christophe (ed.). 2004. Les Musiques nouvelles en Wallonie et à Bruxelles (1960–2003. Collection Musique-Musicologie. Sprimont: Editions Mardaga. .
 Souris, André. 2000. La lyre à double tranchant: écrits sur la musique et le surréalisme, presented and annotated by Robert Wangermée. Sprimont: Editions Mardaga. .

1914 births
1962 deaths
Belgian organists
Male organists
Belgian classical composers
Belgian male classical composers
20th-century classical composers
Twelve-tone and serial composers
Belgian opera composers
Male opera composers
Ballet composers
Walloon people
Academic staff of the Royal Conservatory of Liège
20th-century organists
20th-century Belgian male musicians